Luis Miguel Arconada Etxarri (born 26 June 1954) is a Spanish retired footballer who played as a goalkeeper.

He played only for Real Sociedad for nearly 20 years, and helped the club to four titles including two La Liga championships.

Arconada collected 68 caps for Spain over eight years, and was part of the squads at two World Cups and two European Championships.

Club career
Arconada was born in San Sebastián, Gipuzkoa. Aged 16, he joined local giants Real Sociedad's youth ranks, going on to play there his entire career and being known as "El pulpo" (Octopus in English).

After two seasons backing up Urruti, Arconada became the club's undisputed starter. He was instrumental in consecutive La Liga titles, which led – after the second – to a semi-final run in the European Cup.

Arconada was seriously injured in 1985–86's league opener, which caused him to miss the remainder of the campaign and the 1986 FIFA World Cup. He still returned strong for three more seasons, helping Real Sociedad to two consecutive Copa del Rey finals before retiring at 35 with a total of 414 appearances (551 overall); after that, he remained apart from the football world.

International career
On 27 March 1977, Arconada played his first game for Spain, a 1–1 friendly with Hungary in Alicante, replacing Real Madrid's Miguel Ángel for the second half. Having captained the nation on many occasions, he represented it at the 1978 and 1982 FIFA World Cups as well as at UEFA Euro 1980 and 1984. In the latter competition, his blunder resulted in the opening goal for hosts France in a 2–0 final defeat: he appeared to have smothered a free kick from Michel Platini under his chest in a diving save, but he fumbled the ball, which slid off under his body and rolled slowly into the net; despite his reputation as a world-class goalkeeper, several years later he was still widely remembered for the error, known as "Arconada's goal" in Spain.

Arconada's last game was a 3–0 defeat in Wales for the 1986 World Cup qualifiers. A severe cruciate ligament injury while playing for Real ousted him from the final stages, being replaced by fellow Basque Andoni Zubizarreta.

During the ceremony following Spain's victory in Euro 2008, third choice Andrés Palop wore Arconada's original Euro 84 final shirt as he received the gold medal from Platini, now president of UEFA. Arconada also represented his native country at the 1976 Summer Olympics in Montreal, Quebec, Canada, where Spain was eliminated in the first round.

Style of play
Arconada was known for his leadership, bravery and consistency, and was regarded as one of the best Spanish goalkeepers of all time. His athleticism, speed, shot-stopping ability, reflexes, footwork and acrobatic style served as an inspiration to Iker Casillas.

In 2017, former goalkeeper Manuel Almunia also praised Arconada for his ability to produce saves with his feet.

Personal life
Arconada's younger brother, Gonzalo, never played professional football, but had an extensive coaching career, mainly in the third division. For a few months in early 2006, he coached Real Sociedad's first team.

Honours
Real Sociedad
La Liga: 1980–81, 1981–82
Copa del Rey: 1986–87; runner-up 1987–88
Supercopa de España: 1982

Spain
UEFA European Championship runner-up: 1984

Individual
Ricardo Zamora Trophy: 1979–80, 1980–81, 1981–82

See also
List of La Liga players (400+ appearances)
List of one-club men in association football
List of Real Sociedad players

References

External links
Real Sociedad official profile

Biography at Porteros Vascos de Leyenda 

1954 births
Living people
Spanish footballers
Footballers from San Sebastián
Association football goalkeepers
La Liga players
Tercera División players
Real Sociedad B footballers
Real Sociedad footballers
Spain youth international footballers
Spain amateur international footballers
Spain international footballers
1978 FIFA World Cup players
1982 FIFA World Cup players
UEFA Euro 1980 players
UEFA Euro 1984 players
Olympic footballers of Spain
Footballers at the 1976 Summer Olympics
Basque Country international footballers